Sarika Thakur is an Indian actress and costume designer. In 2005, she won the National Film Award for Best Actress for the English-language film Parzania. She was also awarded the National Film Award for Best Costume Design for her work in Hey Ram (2001).

Early life
Sarika was born in New Delhi into a family of Marathi and Rajput descent. Her father abandoned the family when she was very young. From then on, she became the breadwinner of the family. As she had to work for a living, she did not attend school.

Career
Sarika started her film career as a child actor at the age of 5, playing the role of a boy, Master Sooraj, during the 1960s in Hindi language films. Her most notable and popular appearance as a child artist was in the year 1967 in the musical superhit Hamraaz, where she was seen as the daughter of Vimi named baby Saarika. She appeared in many children's movies. Later, she moved on to films with Rajshri Productions Geet Gaata Chal with Sachin, with whom she starred in many Hindi and Marathi films.

She gave birth to a baby girl, Shruti Hassan in 1986. She gave up her acting career after her marriage to Kamal Haasan and moved to Chennai with him during the peak of her career. Their younger daughter, Akshara Haasan, was born in 1991. After separating from her husband, she made a comeback in Hindi films. She played Ipsita Ray Chakraverti in the film Sacred Evil – A True Story which failed at the box office.

In year 2000, Sarika won the National Film Award for Best Costume Design for the film Hey Ram. Her performance in Parzania in which she plays the role of a Zoroastrian woman who loses her child during the 2002 riots of India, earned her the National Film Award for Best Actress. Khalid Mohamed wrote for Hindustan Times of her performance, "Sarika is marvellously restrained and lifelike, making you care for Parzania straight from the heart."

Sarika has starred as Sheetal Thadani in the movie Bheja Fry (2006), where she played the wife of Rajat Kapoor. She also had a small but important role in Manorama Six Feet Under. Her latest movie is Shoebite, which has been delayed for production, where she stars opposite Amitabh Bachchan.

Sarika made her television debut in Sony TV's Yudh which stars Amitabh Bachchan in the lead role.

Apart from acting, she also served as the costume designer, sound designer and associate director for Kuruthipunal (1995) under Raaj Kamal Films International.

Filmography

Web series

Television

Awards

 National Film Award for Best Actress
Parzania (2005) 
 National Film Award for Best Costume Design
Hey Ram (2000)

References

External links

 
 

Actresses from Delhi
Indian film actresses
Indian child actresses
Actresses in Hindi cinema
Indian amateur radio operators
Best Actress National Film Award winners
Living people
Amateur radio women
Amateur radio people
20th-century Indian actresses
21st-century Indian actresses
Best Costume Design National Film Award winners
Indian costume designers
1962 births